Henry Benjamin Pyrgos (born 9 July 1989) is a Scotland international rugby union player whose regular playing position is scrum-half. He currently plays for Edinburgh Rugby of the United Rugby Championship. 

Pyrgos previously played for Glasgow Warriors where he won the 2014–15 Pro12 title

Rugby Union career

Amateur career

Pyrgos was drafted to Stirling County in the Scottish Premiership for the 2017-18 season.

Professional career

Pyrgos played for Glasgow Warriors in the Pro14. He won the Pro12 title with the club in 2014-15. He was made co-captain of the side (with Jonny Gray) for the season 2016-17. The co-captaincy was scrapped by new head coach Dave Rennie for the 2017-18 season, though the scrum-half remained in the Warriors' leadership group. He played 147 matches for the Warriors before leaving the club at the end of season.

In July 2018 it was confirmed that Pyrgos would be moving to rival team Edinburgh Rugby for the prospect of more frequent game time.

International career

Pyrgos has represented both Scotland Under 20 and Scotland A.

On 24 October 2012 Pyrgos was named in the full Scottish national team for the 2012 end-of-year rugby union tests.

On 6 November 2012, Pyrgos was announced as a substitute for the Scotland versus New Zealand match, the first of the end-of-year test series, and made his debut around a week later when he was brought on in the final five minutes of the match. The final score was 22–51.

Pyrgos's second cap appearance on 17 November was against South Africa at Murrayfield when he scored his first international try, however Scotland lost with a final score of 10–21. His third cap appearance was against Tonga on 24 November where he made the starting line up. This game was played in Pittodrie in Aberdeen and Scotland lost 15–21.

References

External links 
 itsrugby.co.uk profile

1989 births
Living people
British people of Greek descent
Edinburgh Rugby players
Glasgow Warriors players
People educated at Bryanston School
Rugby union players from Dorchester, Dorset
Rugby union scrum-halves
Scotland 'A' international rugby union players
Scotland international rugby union players
Scottish rugby union players
Stirling County RFC players